Bora Stanković may refer to:

 Borisav Stanković (1875–1927), Serbian writer
 Borislav Stanković (1925–2020), basketball official and long-time president of FIBA